The Society for International Development (SID) was founded in Washington, D.C., United States, in 1957.

SID has a network of individual and institutional members, local chapters and partner organisations, in more than 80 countries. It works with more than 100 associations, networks and institutions involving academia, parliamentarians, students, political leaders and development experts, both at local and international level.

Secretariat
The SID Secretariat has been based in Rome since 1979. Additionally, SID opened a Regional Office for Eastern and Southern Africa in Nairobi in 2003.

Governing Council
SID members elect the SID Governing Council via a mail ballot every four years. The current council for the 2012–2015 period is:
President: Juma Volter Mwapachu, Society for International Development, Tanzania
Vice President: Jean Gilson, Senior Vice President, Strategy and Information Technology at DAI
Treasurer: René Grotenhuis, Chief Executive Officer Cordaid, The Netherlands
Managing Director: Stefano Prato, Society for International Development

SID Journal Development

Development is the quarterly journal of the Society for International Development (SID), published by the Palgrave Macmillan press.

The ISO 4 abbreviation for the journal is Development (Rome), but it is also cited as Development (Washington).

Membership
Most SID members are organised into local chapters through which they have the opportunity to engage in development initiatives and events (such as conferences, seminars, lecture series, round tables, advocacy campaigns, charity events) in their locale maintaining a strong link with the territory.

Washington Chapter

The  Washington Chapter is the largest and most active chapter of the Society for International Development, with 150 member organizations and over a thousand individual members.

SID-Washington is committed to three principal objectives:

Stimulating dialogue and cooperation on global development issues
Enhancing skills, knowledge and understanding among development practitioners
Providing a network for individuals and organizations working in various sectors of  international development

Notable event speakers
J. Brian Atwood, former Administrator of USAID and Dean of the Hubert H. Humphrey Institute of Public Affairs
Paul Collier, CBE, Director of the Centre for the Study of African Economies and author of  The Bottom Billion: Why the Poorest Countries are Failing and What Can Be Done about It
Amb. John J. Danilovich, Chief Executive Officer, Millennium Challenge Corporation
Dr. Kemal Derviş, former Administrator of the UNDP and currently Director of the Global Economy and Development Program at the Brookings Institution
 Dr. William Easterly, author of The White Man's Burden: Why the West's Efforts to Aid the Rest Have Done So Much Ill and So Little Good
Michael Fairbanks, Co-Founder of SEVEN and co-author of Plowing the Sea, Nurturing the Hidden Sources of Advantage in Developing Nations
Richard Feachem, KBE, FREng, Director of the Global Health Group
Henrietta H. Fore, former Under-Secretary of State and former Acting Administrator of USAID
Dr. Francis Fukuyama, Director of the International Development Program at the Paul H. Nitze School of Advanced International Studies and author of The End of History and the Last Man
Amb. Zalmay Khalilzad, former United States Ambassador to the United Nations
 Former U.S. Representative Jim Kolbe, former Chairman of the House Appropriations Subcommittee on Foreign Operations
 Dr. Carol Lancaster, Interim Dean of the Edmund A. Walsh School of Foreign Service and former Counsel to the President's Foreign Intelligence Advisory Board
U.S. Representative Nita Lowey, Chair, House Appropriations Subcommittee on Foreign Operations
Ad Melkert, Under-Secretary General of the UN and Associate Administrator of UNDP
Andrew Natsios, former USAID Administrator and President's Special Envoy for Sudan
Amb. John D. Negroponte, former Director of National Intelligence and former Deputy Secretary of State
U.S. Representative David Obey, Chairman, House Appropriations Committee
Ngozi Okonjo-Iweala former Finance Minister and former Foreign Minister of Nigeria
Anne-Marie Slaughter, Director of Policy Planning at the U.S. Department of State
Aaron S. Williams, Director of the Peace Corps

Buenos Aires Chapter
The Buenos Aires Chapter (SID-Baires) was created at the end of 1957, by a group of Argentinean intellectuals and scholars. The chapter – known as "Argentine Chapter" changed the name to "Buenos Aires Chapter" in 2000, following the creation of two new chapters in the cities of Rosario and La Plata. The Buenos Aires Chapter is one of the oldest chapter of SID that has engaged consistently and continuously for more than 50 years in activities and programmers addressing development questions and processes from a both national and international perspective.

In September 2010, the first issue of SIDbaires' new magazine, Qué? Hacer para el Desarrollo, was launched.

Netherlands Chapter

The Society for International Development in the Netherlands (SID NL) was founded in 1991.

Activities
SID NL organises lectures, debates and conferences on international cooperation development. Each activity provides the audience with the opportunity to enter into a debate with influential (international) speaker(s).

SID Lectures
Series of lectures discussing a specific subject from multiple perspectives. The lectures take place at the VU University Amsterdam.
Each series of lectures has a common theme:

2004–2005: Security and Development
2005–2006: Religion, Development and International Relations
2006–2007: Democracy and Development
2007–2008: Emerging Global Scarcities and Power Shifts
2008–2009: Economic Growth and the Common Good
2009–2010: Common Goods in a Divided World
2010–2011: Global Values in a Changing World
2011–2012: The State in a Globalizing World
2012–2013: The Private Sector and Development
2013–2014: Dispersed Power in a World in Transition
2014–2015: New spaces for international engagement in a globalised world

Notable event speakers
Dr. Ben Bot, Former Minister of Foreign Affairs of the Netherlands
Dr. Denis Broun, Executive Director of UNITAID
Dr. J. Brian Atwood, Former Chair of the OECD Development Assistance Committee
Mr. Bert Koenders, Former Minister for Development Cooperation of the Netherlands and current Special Representative and Head of the United Nations Multidimensional Integrated Stabilization Mission in Mali (MINUSMA). 
Prof. Dr. Thomas Pogge, author of ‘World Poverty and Human Rights’
Mrs. Agnes van Ardenne, Former Minister for Development Cooperation of the Netherlands
Prof. Paul Collier, Director for the Centre for the Study of African Economies at the University of Oxford
Dr. Jan Pronk, Former Minister for Development Cooperation of the Netherlands and former Special Representative and Head of Mission for the United Nations Mission in Sudan
Dr. Inge Kaul, Adjunct professor at the Hertie School of Governance
Prof. Dr. He Wenping, Director of African Studies section, Institute of West-Asian & African Studies, Chinese Academy of Social Sciences
Mr. Anwar Ibrahim, Former Deputy Prime Minister and former Finance Minister of Malaysia
Mr. Ad Melkert, Former Minister of Social Affairs and Employment of the Netherlands and former Special Representative of the Secretary-General of the United Nations in Iraq
Mrs. Manuela Monteiro, Former Director of Hivos
Judge Song Sang-Hyun, President of the International Criminal Court in the Hague
Dr. Jan-Peter Balkenende, Former Prime-Minister of the Netherlands
Dr. Benjamin Barber, Author of "Why Mayors Should Rule the World" 
Ms. Lilianne Ploumen, Minister for Foreign Trade and Development Cooperation of the Netherlands

Other activities
The organisation of ad hoc debates and panel discussions on topical issues
The organisation of expert meetings, where invitees debate a particular issue. Expert meetings have taken place on topics such as global citizenship, migration and performance based aid
The organisation of network events
The publication of reports

References

External links 

 Official website

1957 establishments in the United States
International development organizations
Organizations established in 1957
Organizations based in Washington, D.C.